The UAB Blazers football team represents the University of Alabama at Birmingham (UAB) in the sport of American football. The Blazers compete in the Football Bowl Subdivision (FBS) of the National Collegiate Athletic Association (NCAA) and American Athletic Conference (The American). The team is led by head coach Trent Dilfer, who was named the program’s 7th head coach on November 30th, 2022. Home games were previously held at Legion Field in Birmingham from the 1991 season to the 2020 season.  A new stadium, Protective Stadium, has been the home of the Blazers starting from the 2021 season.  The new stadium's capacity is over 47,000.

The UAB football program was terminated after the 2014 season but was reinstated shortly thereafter. The team went on hiatus for two seasons before returning in 2017. UAB won both its first conference championship and bowl game in program history in 2018.

History

Jim Hilyer era (1991–1994)
UAB football began with the play of an organized club football team in 1989. After two years competing as a club football team, on March 13, 1991, UAB President Charles McCallum and athletic director Gene Bartow announced that the university would compete in football as an NCAA Division III team beginning in the fall of 1991, with Jim Hilyer serving as the first head coach.

From 1991 to 1992, UAB competed as a Division III Independent, and during this period, the Blazers compiled an 11–6–2 overall record. During this period, the Blazers played their first all-time game on September 7, 1991, a 28–0 loss at Millsaps, and notched their first all-time win on September 21, 1991, a 34–21 victory at Washington & Lee. After only a pair of seasons at the Division III level, an NCAA ruling resulted in the Blazers being reclassified as a I-AA team for the 1993 season. The reclassification was a result of the NCAA prohibiting a school's athletic program from being multi-divisional, and since UAB already competed in Division I in other sports, the move became necessary. In their first game as a I-AA team, the Blazers would lose to Troy State 37–3 before a home crowd on September 6, 1993. By 1994, the Blazers would play their first I-A opponent against Kansas. Following the 1994 season, coach Hilyer would resign with Watson Brown being announced as the program's second ever coach on January 2, 1995.

During the 1995 season, the Blazers would notch their first ever victory over a I-A opponent on the road against North Texas by a score of 19–14. From 1993 to 1995, UAB competed as a Division I-AA Independent, and during this period compiled a 21–12 overall record before making the jump to Division I-A for the 1996 season.

Watson Brown era (1995–2006)
Watson Brown came to UAB from Oklahoma, where he served as offensive coordinator. On November 9, 1995, UAB was officially informed by the NCAA that the school had met all requirements for reclassification, and as such the Blazers would enter the 1996 season as an I-A Independent. In their first I-A game, UAB was defeated by in-state rival Auburn 29–0, and would finish their first I-A season with a 5–6 overall record. Already a participating member in other sports, on November 13, 1996, Conference USA  commissioner Michael Slive announced that UAB would be admitted to the league as a football playing member for the 1999 season.

Following the transition to I-A, UAB often played a couple of out-of-conference games with college football's traditional powers every year. In 2000, UAB achieved a monumental victory by beating the SEC's LSU Tigers in Baton Rouge. In 2004, UAB reached yet another milestone earning its first bowl trip in school history, to the Hawaii Bowl.

After being the face of the program for 12 years, on December 9, 2006, Watson Brown resigned as UAB's head coach to take the head coaching position at Tennessee Tech.

Neil Callaway era (2007–2011)
Following Brown's resignation, UAB first intended to promote assistant Pat Sullivan, but the University of Alabama system board of trustees blocked the promotion.  UAB then had a deal in place with Jimbo Fisher, then offensive coordinator at LSU, who would eventually go on to be the head coach at Florida State. The trustees again denied UAB its desired hire. Following the scuttling of the deal with Fisher, some sportswriters, including CBSSports.com reporter Gregg Doyel, noted that Alabama was also looking for a new head coach at the time, adding that Fisher had served as offensive coordinator when Alabama's top candidate Nick Saban had been head coach at LSU. Doyel postulated that because of this familiarity, Alabama may have looked to hire Fisher and thus the trustees did not want UAB interfering with the potential hire and consequently impeded their coaching search.

After exhausting many options, UAB finally turned to former Alabama player and Georgia offensive coordinator Neil Callaway, who was named head coach on December 17, 2006. The hire was strongly questioned by some, as Callaway did not exactly have a history of success. In his first season, Callaway led the Blazers to the school's worst record (2–10), dropping the program's all-time record under .500 for the first time in school history.

On November 27, 2011, Callaway was fired as UAB's head coach having compiled a record of 18 wins and 42 losses (18–42) during his five years with the Blazers.

Garrick McGee era (2012–2013)
On December 4, 2011, UAB officials announced they had hired Garrick McGee to serve as the fourth head coach in the history of the program. McGee was the only African American to ever be football head coach at UAB. The Blazers posted a 3–9 record in McGee's first season as head coach and a 2–10 record in his second.

On January 9, 2014, it was announced that McGee would resign as UAB head coach to join Bobby Petrino as offensive coordinator at Louisville.

Bill Clark era (2014–2021)
In January 2014, former Jacksonville State head coach Bill Clark was hired to serve as the next head coach at UAB. In his first season as head coach of the Blazers, the team composed a 6–6 record, its best since 2004.

On November 30, 2014, a day after the Blazers had become bowl eligible for the first time since 2004, Sports Illustrated reported that UAB was planning to fire athletic director Brian Mackin and end the football program. On December 2, UAB president Ray Watts officially announced that, after commissioning an in-depth inspection of UAB's athletic budget and revenue and how the elimination of football from the athletic program would affect those, UAB had decided to close down the football program, along with the rifle and bowling programs, in order to save money. The decision was met with great outrage and criticism of Watts as well as the University of Alabama Board of Trustees. According to Watts, projected costs of a credible football program would cost the school $49 million over the next five years, over the $20 million a year already spent on the program, and that after five years this cost would likely continue to rise. An independent task force was formed to evaluate this decision and the findings of the report on which the decision was based.

On June 1, 2015, Watts announced that due to the public opinion and the fundraising of more than $27 million towards the program, the UAB Blazers football program would be reinstated to begin play as early as the 2016 season. On July 21, UAB stated their intention to resume football in time for the 2017 season, while the bowling and rifle programs would be immediately reinstated. Athletic Director Mark Ingram indicated that 2017 was a more reasonable timeline to field a football team, due to the number of players who transferred away from the program following the termination and the NCAA's recruiting rules. On June 4, Conference USA announced it would not take any action against UAB now that it has reinstated football, and the school would, in effect, remain in the conference. On July 21, the NCAA cleared UAB to resume playing football in 2017, and to continue competing in FBS. On January 16, 2016, the UAB football team announced its slate of non-conference opponents for when it returned to play in the 2017 season.

On August 29, 2016, UAB broke ground on a $22.5-million football operations center including a $4.2-million covered pavilion practice field with an anticipated completion date of summer 2017. The center was opened to the public on August 18, 2017.

On November 4, 2017, in its first year back from a 2-year hiatus, UAB became bowl eligible after defeating Rice 52–21 at Legion Field.  The following week, UAB defeated UTSA on the road to win their seventh game of the season, tying the school's record for wins since becoming an FBS program.

On December 1, 2018, UAB defeated Middle Tennessee to win its first conference championship in program history.

On December 18, 2018 UAB defeated Northern Illinois in the Cheribundi Boca Raton Bowl 37–13 for their first bowl win.

Clark resigned on June 24, 2022 after seven seasons, citing back problems. Offensive coordinator Bryant Vincent was named interim head coach for the 2022 season.

Trent Dilfer era (2023–present)
On November 30, 2022, Trent Dilfer, who played for 13 years in the NFL, was announced to be the Blazers' new head coach.

Conference affiliations
 Independent - Division III (1991–1992)
 Independent - Division I-AA (1993–1995)
 Independent - Division I-A (1996–1998)
 Conference USA (1999–2022)
 American Athletic Conference (2023–future)

Championships

Conference championships
The Blazers have won two conference championships.

Division championships
The Blazers have been members of Conference USA since 1999. The conference split into two divisions in 2005, with UAB competing in the East Division until 2014. In 2017, UAB was moved into the West Division, where the Blazers won three division titles. C-USA eliminated its divisions after losing three of its previous 14 members after the 2021 season.
 

† Co-champions

Bowl games
The Blazers have played in six bowl games, compiling a record of 3–3.

Rivalries
Southern Miss

UAB and Southern Miss have met 18 times with the 1st matchup being in 2000 where Southern Miss won 33-30. The Blazers and Golden Eagles have met every season since, other than 2015 and 2016 when UAB did not field a team. Southern Miss won the first 9 meetings but UAB has won 7 out of the last 9 to bring the record to 11-7 in favor of The Golden Eagles. The rivalry has been placed on hold indefinitely with Southern Miss leaving CUSA in 2022 for the Sun Belt Conference.

Troy

Troy and UAB have met a total of 12 times. Both teams met fairly consistently until 2014. The teams are scheduled to renew their rivalry in 2028. Troy holds the series lead, 7-5.

Memphis

UAB and Memphis annually played a Rivalry Game called “The Battle of the Bones” with the winning team getting a 100 lb bronze statue of a rack of ribs. This pays homage to both school’s cities prominence in BBQ. The rivalry ended when Memphis moved to the American Athletic Conference after the 2012 season. UAB leads the all-time record 10-5, but Memphis won the last matchup which allowed the Tigers to keep the Bones Trophy. The rivalry will be rekindled in 2023 when UAB joins Memphis in the American Athletic Conference.

Future non-conference opponents
Announced schedules as of August 11, 2022.

References

External links

 

 
American football teams established in 1991
1991 establishments in Alabama